The Carlos Palanca Memorial Awards for Literature winners for 2011 received their medals (for first Prize winners only), certificates (for all winners) and cash prizes during awarding ceremonies held on September 1, 2011, at the Peninsula Hotel Manila in Makati.  Guest of honor and speaker was National Artist for Literature Francisco Sionil Jose, who was conferred the Gawad Dangal ng Lahi by awards director, Sylvia Palanca - Quirino. Victor Emmanuel Carmelo 'Vim' Nadera served as Master of Ceremonies.

English division 
Novel
 Grand prize: "In the Service of Secrets" by Maria Victoria Vega Soliven - Blanco (Marivi Soliven - Blanco)
Judges: J. Neil Garcia (Chairman), Benjamin S. Bautista, Criselda Yabes

Short story 
 First prize: "The Big Man" by Asterio Enrico N. Gutierrez
 Second prize: "Disappearances" by Alexis A. L. Abola
 Third prize: "Prodigal" by Johannes L. Chua
Judges: Dean Francis Alfar (Chairman), Shirley O. Lua, Esther M. Pacheco

Short story for children
 First prize: "Tom Yum" by Georgina Veronica G. Alfar (Nikki Alfar)
 Second prize: "Tatay, Through the Wind and the Waves" by Georgianna R. De Vera
 Third prize: "Gagamba, The Spider from the Islands" by Benjamin Pimentel
Judges: Beaulah Pedregosa - Taguiwalo (Chairman), Feny Delos Angeles - Bautista, Luis Joaquin M. Katigbak

Essay
 First prize: "The Turn for Home: Memories of Santa Ana Park" by Jennifer Rebecca L. Ortuoste (Jenny Ortuoste)
 Second prize: "The River of Gold" by Jeena Rani Marquez - Manaois
 Third prize: "The Stain of Blackberries" by Rosario Cruz - Lucero 
Judges: Federico M. Macaranas (Chairman), Katrina P. Tuvera - Quimbo, Thelma E. Arambulo

Poetry
 First prize: "Maps" by Eliza A. Victoria
 Second prize: "Stones and Other Poems" by Lourdes Marie S. La Viña
 Third prize: "Maguindanao" by Simeon Dumdum, Jr.
Judges: Mariano 'Marne' L. Kilates (Chairman), Joel M. Toledo, Mikael De Lara Co 

Poetry for children
 First prize: "The Universe and Other Poems" by Cynthia Baculi - Condez
 Second prize: "The Shape of Happiness" by Peter Solis Nery
 Third prize: "The Shaggy Brown Chicken and Other Poems for children (and for Chicken of All Ages)" by Kris Lanot Lacaba
Judges: Edgardo B. Maranan (Chairman), Maria Elena Paterno - Locsin, Lina B. Diaz de Rivera

One-act play
 First prize: "Evening at the Opera" by Florencio C. Quintos (Floy Quintos)
 Second prize: No Winner
 Third prize: No Winner
Judges: Glenn Sevilla Mas (Chairman), Ronan Capinding, Josefina Estrella

Full Length Play
 First prize: "A Return Home" by Joshua L. Lim So
 Second prize: "If the Shoe Fits (Or, The Five Men Imelda Marcos Meets in Heaven)" by Peter Solis Nery
 Third prize: "Freshmen" by Jonathan R. Guillermo
Judges: Miguel Faustmann (Chairman), Malou Jacob, Nestor O. Jardin

Filipino division 
Nobela (Novel)
 Grand prize: "Ang Banal na Aklat ng Mga Kumag" by Allan Alberto N. Derain
Judges: Reynaldo A. Duque (Chairman), Lilia F. Antonio, Fanny A. Garcia

Maikling Kuwento (Short story)
 First prize: No Winner
 Second prize: No Winner
 Third prize: "Metro Gwapo" by Michael S. Bernaldez
Judges: Jimmuel C. Naval (Chairman), Fidel Rillo, Jr., Marco Aniano V. Lopez

Maikling Kuwentong Pambata (Short story for children)
 First prize: "Alamat ng Duhat" by Segundo D. Matias Jr. (Jun Matias)
 Second prize: "Sa Tapat ng Tindahan ni Mang Teban" by Joachim Emilio B. Antonio
 Third prize:  "Si Inda, Ang Manok at Ang Mga Lamang-lupa " by Christian U. Tordecillas
Judges: Dina Ocampo - Cristobal (Chairman), Virgilio V. Vitug, Felicitas E. Pado

Sanaysay (Essay)
 First prize: "Ang Pag-uwi ng Alibughang Anak ng Lupa" by Bernadette V. Neri
 Second prize: "Nagbibihis na ang Nanay" by Rosario Torres - Yu
 Third prize: "Kubeta" by Nancy Kimuell - Gabriel
Judges: Pamela C. Constantino (Chairman), Vina P. Paz, Lourd de Veyra

Tula (Poetry)
 First prize: "Agua" by Enrique Sia Villasis
 Second prize: "Mga Nakaw na Linya" by Joseph Rosmon M. Tuazon
 Third prize: "Ilang Tala Hinggil sa Daangbakal" by Christopher B. Nuyles
Judges: Rebecca T. Añonuevo (Chairman), Rofel G. Brion, Alfonso S. Mendoza

Tulang Pambata (Poetry for children)
 First prize: "Ako ang Bida" by Marcel L. Milliam
 Second prize: "Isang Mabalahibong Bugtong" by Eugene Y. Evasco
 Third prize: "Manghuhuli Ako ng Sinag ng Araw" by John Enrico C. Torralba
Judges: Heidi Emily Eusebio - Abad (Chairman), German Villanueva Gervacio, Jesus Manuel Santiago

Dulang May Isang Yugto (One-act play)
 First prize: "Ondoy: Ang Buhay sa Bubong" by Remi Karen M. Velasco
 Second prize: "El Galeon de Simeon" by Layeta P. Bucoy
 Third prize: "Posporo" by Bernardo O. Aguay Jr.
Judges: Roy C. Iglesias (Chairman), Clodualdo del Mundo, Jr., Maribel Legarda

Dulang May Ganap na Haba (Full-length play)
 First prize: "Paalam, Señor Soledad" by Rodolfo C. Vera
 Second prize: "Tamala" by Liza C. Magtoto
 Third prize: "Panahon ng Sampung Libong Ilong" by Joshua L. Lim So 
Judges: Rosauro 'Uro' Q. Dela Cruz (Chairman), Chris B. Millado, Robert Seña

Dulang Pampelikula (Screenplay)
 First prize: "Tru Lab" by Lemuel E. Garcellano
 Second prize: "Huling Isang Taon" by T-Jay K. Medina
 Third prize: "Emmanuel" by Helen V. Lasquite
Judges: Ricky Davao (Chairman), Gil Portes, Joel Lamangan

Regional languages division 
Short story in Cebuano
 First prize: "Ang Tawo sa Punoan sa Nangka sa Hinablayan" by Richel G. Dorotan
 Second prize: "Isla Verde" by Errol A, Merquita
 Third prize: "Black Pearl" by Macario D. Tiu
Judges: Edgar S. Godin (Chairman), Erlinda Kintanar Alburo, Jaime L. An Lim

Short story in Hiligaynon
 First prize: "Donato Bugtot" by Peter Solis Ner
 Second prize: "Kahapunanon sa Laguerta ni Alberto" by Alice Tan - Gonzales
 Third prize: "Pabalon" by Kizza Grace F. Gardoce
Judges: Nereo E. Jedeliz, Jr. (Chairman), Resurrección Hidalgo, Genevieve L. Asenjo

Short story in Iluko
 First prize: Saddam by Ariel Sotelo Tabag
 Second prize: "Ayuno" by Juan A. Asuncion
 Third prize: "Ti Agdamdamili" by Norberto D. Bumanglang, Jr.
Judges: Honor Blanco Cabie (Chairman), Roy V. Aragon, Priscilla Supnet Macansantos

Kabataan division 
English
 First prize: "The Golden Mean" by Mariah Christelle F. Reodica (St. Pedro Poveda College; Mandaluyong)
 Second prize: "Of Pixels and Power" by Scott Lee Chua (Xavier School; Greenhills, San Juan City)
 Third prize: "Gods of the Internet" by Leo Francis F. Abot (Ateneo de Manila University; Quezon City)
Filipino
 First prize: "Ang Makulit, Ang Mapagtanong, at Ang Mundo ng Kasagutan" by Mary Amie Gelina E. Dumatol (University of the Philippines - Manila)
 Second prize: "Nang Maging Mendiola Ko ang Internet Dahil Kay Mama" by Abegail Joy Yuson Lee (Saint Jude Catholic School; San Miguel, Manila)
 Third prize: "Isang Pindot sa Kamalayan" by Maria Bettina Clare N. Camacho (University of the Philippines - Diliman)
Judges (both categories): Grace Dacanay Chong (Chairman), Perfecto T. Martin, Ruel S. De Vera

References 

 Programme, 61st Don Carlos Palanca Memorial Awards for Literature (Leaflet).
http://www.gmanetwork.com/news/story/231241/lifestyle/reviews/writers-old-and-new-shine-at-the-palanca-awards
http://newsinfo.inquirer.net/52695/55-writers-top-this-year%E2%80%99s-edition-of-palanca-awards
http://www.philippinestoday.net/archives/2882
http://www.mindanews.com/top-stories/2011/09/04/2-davao-writers-bag-palanca-awards/

External links 
Carlos Palanca Memorial Awards for Literature

2011
Palanca